George Andreani, pseudonym Josef Dvořáček
(born as Josef Kumok; 28 February 1901 in Warsaw, Poland – 2 April 1979 in Buenos Aires, Argentina) was a Polish composer, film score composer, pianist, conductor, and actor. He was noted for his scores of some 75 Argentine films during the Golden Age of Argentine cinema from 1937 to 1959.
Aside from his prolific work as a score composer, he was also conductor of the Orquesta Sinfónica Schenley in the 1940s.

Filmography as composer

As Josef Kumok:
 1932: Lelíček ve službách Sherlocka Holmese
 1932: Načeradec král kibiců
 1932: Právo na hřích
 1932: Tisíc za jednu noc
 1933:	Její lékař
 1933: Madla z cihelny
 1933: Okénkocs
 1933: Rozmary mládí
 1933: Sejde s očí, sejde s mysli...
 1934: Dokud máš maminku
 1934: Grand Hotel Nevada
 1934: Hudba srdcí
 1934: Zlatá Kateřina
 1935: Raging Barbora
 1935: Pan otec Karafiát
 1936: Le Golem
 1936: Naše XI.
 1936: Sextánka
 1937: Děvčátko z venkova
 1938: Bílá vrána
As George Andreani:
 1937: Fuera de la ley
 1938: La chismosa
 1940: The Englishman of the Bones 
 1941:  White Eagle 
 1941: Embrujo
 1942: Noche de bodas
 1942: El gran secreto
 1942: En el último piso
 1942: Locos de verano
 1942: A Light in the Window
 1942: La novia de primavera
 1942: Los chicos crecen
 1943: Safo, historia de una pasión
 1943: 16 años
 1944: Se rematan ilusiones
 1944: La pequeña señora de Pérez
 1945: Rigoberto
 1945: La señora de Pérez se divorcia
 1945: Swan Song 
 1945: Las seis suegras de Barba Azul
 1946: The Lady of Death  
 1946: The Naked Angel 
 1946: Un beso en la nuca
 1946: No salgas esta noche
 1946: Adán y la serpiente
 1946: Deshojando margaritas
 1947: La dama del collar
 1947: Treinta segundos de amor
 1947: Los verdes paraísos
 1947: Con el diablo en el cuerpo
 1948: La locura de don Juan
 1948: Los secretos del buzón
 1948: La muerte camina en la lluvia
 1948: Hoy cumple años mamá
 1948: Una atrevida aventurita
 1948: Los pulpos
 1948: Novio, marido y amante
 1949: ¿Por qué mintió la cigüeña?
 1949: La otra y yo
 1949: Yo no elegí mi vida
 1949: Miguitas en la cama
 1949: Morir en su ley
 1949: The Trap
 1949: El extraño caso de la mujer asesinada
 1949: Un pecado por mes
 1949: Un hombre solo no vale nada
 1950: Juan Mondiola
 1950: Valentina 
 1950: ¿Vendrás a medianoche?
 1950: Arroz con leche
 1950: Filomena Marturano
 1951: The Goddess of Rio Beni 
 1950: Cinco locos en la pista
 1950: Cuando besa mi marido
 1950: No me digas adiós
 1950: Abuso de confianza
 1950: Sacachispas
 1951: El complejo de Felipe
 1951: La mujer del león
 1951: Cartas de amor
 1951: Reportaje en el infierno
 1951: Volver a la vida
 1951: Martín Pescador
 1951: Una noche cualquiera
 1951: La comedia inmortal
 1951: De turno con la muerte
 1952: Mi hermano Esopo (Historia de un Mateo)
 1953: El muerto es un vivo
 1954: Río Turbio
 1954: María Magdalena
 1955: El festín de Satanás
 1955: Marianela
 1955: Canario rojo
 1955: Concierto para una lágrima
 1957: La sombra de Safo
 1958: Hombres salvajes
 1959: Culpas ajenas

References 

1901 births
1979 deaths
Polish film score composers
Male film score composers
Argentine film score composers
Polish composers
Polish conductors (music)
Male conductors (music)
Musicians from Warsaw
Polish emigrants to Argentina
20th-century conductors (music)
20th-century Polish pianists
20th-century composers
Male pianists
20th-century male musicians